Mountain Home is an unincorporated community in central Duchesne County, Utah, United States, adjacent to the Uintah and Ouray Indian Reservation.

Description

The community lies along local roads north of State Route 87, north of the city of Duchesne, the county seat of Duchesne County. Mountain Home was originally settled in 1905 as part of the Moon Lake Ward of the LDS Church.

Mountain Home is situated in a fertile valley that is mainly used to raise range cattle. It is known as "The Gateway to the High Uintas".

Mountain Home's most notable old families include the Farnsworths, the Thaynes and the Mileses. Its most notable attractions include the Rock Creek Store and Bed and Breakfast, as well as the 7-11 Ranch. The Rock Creek Store and Bed & Breakfast is the original building that contained the Moon Lake First Ward church.  Mountain Home is also the birthplace of Evan Mecham, who served as Governor of Arizona.

Although Mountain Home is unincorporated, it has a post office, with the ZIP code of 84051.

See also

 High Uintas Wilderness
 Upper Stillwater Reservoir
 Moon Lake (Utah)
 Uintah and Ouray Indian Reservation

References

External links

Unincorporated communities in Duchesne County, Utah
Unincorporated communities in Utah